Miss Universe 2013 was the 62nd Miss Universe pageant, held at the Crocus City Hall in Krasnogorsk, Moscow, Russia on November 9, 2013.

At the end of the event, Olivia Culpo of the United States crowned Gabriela Isler of Venezuela as Miss Universe 2013. It is Venezuela's seventh victory, the second-most in the pageant's history.

Contestants from 86 countries and territories competed in this year's pageant. The pageant was hosted by Thomas Roberts and Mel B, with Jeannie Mai as backstage correspondent. Russian singer Emin Agalarov, American pop rock band Panic! at the Disco, and American singer-songwriter Steven Tyler performed in this year's pageant.

Background

Location and date 
In May 2013, the Miss Universe Organization was in talks to host the 2013 edition of the competition in Russia after Emin Agalarov, son of Aras Agalarov and vice-president of Crocus Group, filmed his latest music video in Los Angeles with Miss Universe 2012 Olivia Culpo as his co-star. Paula Shugart, top executive of Miss Universe at that time, raised the idea of hosting the 2013 edition of the pageant in Russia. Agalarov promptly agreed to pay $20 million in exchange for Trump bringing the 2013 Miss Universe competition to Russia. After four weeks of Emin Agalarov's video shoot with Culpo, Trump agreed that the pageant will be held in Moscow at the Crocus City complex, which is owned by the Agalarov family.

On June 16, 2013, during the Miss USA 2013 pageant in Las Vegas, Donald Trump, owner of the Miss Universe Organization, and Miss Universe 2012 Olivia Culpo announced that the Miss Universe 2013 pageant will take place in Moscow, Russia on November 9, 2013. The announcement came after Rob Goldstone, music manager of Russian singer Emin Agalarov, posted on Facebook saying: "Fun meeting with Donald Trump." After the announcement, president of the Crocus Group Aras Agalarov, and his son Emin Agalarov joined Trump on stage to sign the official contract.

Years after the event, the owner at the time, Donald Trump, is involved in an ongoing controversy related to the pageant in Russia and activities alleged in the Steele dossier.

Hosts and performers 

On August 15, 2013, Andy Cohen, who is openly gay, declined to co-host the pageant, due to the country's recent adoption of anti-gay laws. An Internet petition was also started for the Miss Universe Organization to relocate the pageant from Moscow due to these laws as well as human rights concerns. MSNBC anchor Thomas Roberts, also openly gay, took on hosting duties. While he condemned Russia for its anti-gay law, he stated his belief that his presence in Russia would make for a more effective statement against Russian homophobia than boycotting.

Selection of participants 
Contestants from 86 countries and territories were selected to compete in the pageant. Nine of these delegates were appointees to their national titles and another was crowned after the organization discovered that there was an error in the placements of the finalists.

Hinarani de Longeaux, the first runner-up of Miss France 2013, was appointed to represent France after Marine Lorphelin, Miss France 2013, placed first runner-up at Miss World 2013 and was ineligible to compete for Miss Universe 2013. Ana Vrcelj, the second runner-up of Miss Serbia 2012, replaced Aleksandra Doknić as Miss Universe Serbia 2013 after Doknić replaced Nikolina Bojić as Miss Serbia 2012 because she was married.

Denise Garrido originally was crowned as Miss Universe Canada 2013. However, Garrido was stripped of the crown after a few hours when the organization discovered that there was a "typo" when the judges' handwritten scores were transferred into a computer program that determines the results. The official winner was Riza Santos, who was previously placed as first runner-up, while Garrido placed as third runner-up.

The 2013 edition saw the debut of Azerbaijan, and the returns of Austria, Kazakhstan, Myanmar, Slovenia, and Turks and Caicos Islands. Myanmar last competed in 1961 as Burma, which makes the country's first time to compete after more than five decades of withdrawing from Miss Universe, Austria last competed in 2004, while the others last competed in 2011. Albania, the Cayman Islands, Cyprus, Georgia, Ireland, Kosovo, Montenegro, Saint Lucia, and Uruguay withdrew. Mirjeta Shala of Kosovo withdrew because her visa was denied by Russia as it does not recognize Kosovo as an independent country. The withdrawal of Shala subsequently resulted to the withdrawal of Miss Universe Albania Fioralba Dizdari from the pageant due to political reasons. Janet Kerdikoshvili of Georgia withdrew due to unexpected health problems. However, both Kerdikoshvili and Shala competed in the pageant two years later. Nikoleta Jovanović of Montenegro withdrew as she did not meet the minimum age requirements, while Micaela Orsi of Uruguay withdrew because her visa application was denied by the Russian Embassy and due to some disagreements from her national director. The Cayman Islands, Cyprus, Ireland, and Saint Lucia withdrew after their respective organizations failed to hold a national competition or appoint a delegate.

Results

Placements

§ - Voted into the Top 16 by viewers

Final Scores 
After 2 years, the final scores returned. However, instead of being televised, the judge's results were shown through the "You Be The Judge" app. Here, the public could participate online and evaluate each of the participants, where viewers could vote for one candidate to advance into the semi-finals. At the end of the competitions, viewers were able to get an exclusive look at the official 2013 MISS UNIVERSE finals judges’ scores.

Special awards

Best National Costume

Pageant

Format 
Same with 2011, 15 semifinalists were chosen through the preliminary competition— composed of the swimsuit and evening gown competitions and closed-door interviews. The internet voting is still being implemented, with fans being able to vote for another delegate to advance into the semifinals, making the number of semifinalists 16. The top 16 competed in the swimsuit competition and were narrowed down to the top 10 afterward. The top 10 competed in the evening gown competition and were narrowed down to the top 5 afterward. The top 5 competed in the question and answer round and the final look.

Selection committee

Preliminary competition 
 Irina Agalarova – Russian fashion icon
 Corinne Nicolas – modeling industry veteran
 David Perozzi – Emmy-nominated producer and journalist
 Alicia Quarles – New York-based correspondent for E! News
 Gabriel Rivera-Barraza – fashion publicist and philanthropist
 Jose Sariego – Senior Vice President of Business and Legal Affairs for Telemundo Media
 Elena Semikina – Miss Universe Canada 2010

Final telecast 
 Carol Alt – American model and actress, host of Fox News program A Healthy You & Carol Alt
 Italo Fontana – Italian watchmaker, founder of U-Boat Watches
 Philipp Kirkorov – Russian pop singer
 Tara Lipinski – retired American figure skater, Olympic gold medalist
 Nobu Matsuhisa – Japanese celebrity chef and restaurateur
 Farouk Shami – Palestinian-American businessman, founder of professional hair care products company Farouk Systems
 Steven Tyler – lead vocalist of Aerosmith, former American Idol judge
 Anne Vyalitsyna – Russian model, coach for Oxygen reality show The Face

Contestants 

86 contestants competed for the title.

Notes

References

External links
 Miss Universe official website

2013 beauty pageants
2013
Beauty pageants in Russia
2013 in Russia
November 2013 events in Europe
Events in Moscow